Anikin Pochinok is a rural locality (a village) in Tolshmenskoye Rural Settlement, Totemsky  District, Vologda Oblast, Russia. The population was 34 as of 2002.

Geography 
Anikin Pochinok is located 82 km southwest of Totma (the district's administrative centre) by road. Galkino is the nearest rural locality.

References 

Rural localities in Tarnogsky District